Don Tan is the southeasternmost district (amphoe) of Mukdahan province, northeastern Thailand.

History
Originally Don Tan was a tambon of Mukdahan district, Nakhon Phanom province. Don Tan was upgraded to a minor district (king amphoe) in 1963, which was further upgraded to a full district in 1974. When the government established Mukdahan Province in 1982, Don Tan district was assigned to be a district of the new province.

Geography
Neighboring districts are (from the southeast clockwise) Chanuman of Amnat Charoen province; Loeng Nok Tha of Yasothon province; Nikhom Kham Soi and Mueang Mukdahan of Mukdahan Province. To the east across the Mekong River is the Laotian province of Savannakhet.

The important water resource is the Mekong River.

Administration
The district is divided into seven sub-districts (tambons), which are further subdivided into 62 villages (mubans). Don Tan is a sub-district municipality (thesaban tambon) which covers parts of the tambon Don Tan. There are a further seven tambon administrative organizations (TAO).

References

External links
amphoe.com (Thai)

Don Tan